The Sea Wolf is a lost 1920 American drama film based upon the 1904 novel by Jack London, directed by George Melford, and starring Noah Beery as the brutal sea captain Wolf Larsen, sometimes referred to as "The Sea Wolf." The supporting cast includes Mabel Julienne Scott, Tom Forman, Raymond Hatton, and A. Edward Sutherland.

The film was remade twenty-one years later with Edward G. Robinson in Beery's role.

Plot
As described in a film magazine, Wolf Larsen (Beery), captain of the sealing steamer The Ghost, receives a severe blow to his head in a fight with his brother Death Larsen (Gordon) on the day he is to sail. Following the wreck of a ferry boat, rich idler Humphrey Van Weyden (Forman) and his fiancee Maud Brewster (Scott) are picked up by Larson's crew. Wolf refuses to put the couple ashore and makes Humphrey the cabin boy. George Leach (Sutherland), the former cabin boy, and sailor Old Man Johnson (Huntley), enraged at Wolf for his brutal treatment, throw him and mate Black Harris (Long) overboard. The mate is drowned but Wolf comes up the log-line and then over the side on deck, where he beats up his whole crew. The Ghost reaches the seal grounds. Death Larson's ship comes into sight, and Death and part of his crew attempt to board Wolf's ship, but Wolf has them bound and gagged. That night Wolf steers his ship into a fog bank to escape Death's ship. Wolf goes to Maud's cabin and attacks her, and Humphrey puts up a losing fight. At the climax Wolf succumbs to a blinding headache. Humphrey and Maud escape in an open boat to an uninhabited island. Wolf's crew deserts and he is left alone on The Ghost, which runs aground on the island. The paralyzed, blind, and helpless Wolf is cared for by Maud. Soon afterwards he dies and the couple are rescued by a revenue cutter.

Cast
Noah Beery	as Wolf Larsen
 Mabel Julienne Scott as Maud Brewster
 Tom Forman as Humphrey Van Weyden
 James Gordon as "Death" Larsen
 Raymond Hatton as Thomas Mugridge, the Cook
 A. Edward Sutherland as George Leach, the Cabin Boy (billed as Eddie Sutherland)
 Walter Long as "Black" Harris, the Mate
 Fred Huntley as Old Man Johnson
 Kamuela C. Searle as A Seaman
 Peggy Pearce in undetermined role

Gallery

References

External links

 
 

1920 films
American silent feature films
American black-and-white films
1920s adventure drama films
American adventure drama films
Films based on The Sea-Wolf
Sea adventure films
Seafaring films
Films directed by George Melford
Lost American films
1920 lost films
Lost adventure drama films
1920 drama films
1920s American films
Silent American drama films
Silent adventure films